During the 2000–01 German football season, 1. FC Kaiserslautern competed in the Bundesliga.

Season summary
Although Kaiserlautern recorded the same number of points as they had the previous season, they finished in 8th, three places lower. Greater success came in the UEFA Cup, as Kaiserlautern reached the semi-finals before being eliminated by Deportivo Alavés.

Players

First-team squad
Squad at end of season

Left club during season

Competitions

Bundesliga

League table

DFB-Pokal

First round

Second round

UEFA Cup

First round

Kaiserslautern won 3–2 on aggregate.

Second round

Kaiserslautern win 5-4 on aggregate

Third round

Kaiserslautern win 3–1 on aggregate.

Fourth round

Kaiserslautern won 1–0 on aggregate.

Quarter-finals

Match interrupted for 16 minutes due to supporter disturbances.
Kaiserslautern won 2–0 on aggregate

Semi-finals

Alavés won 9–2 on aggregate.

References

Notes

1. FC Kaiserslautern seasons
German football clubs 2000–01 season